Brian McClure (born December 28, 1963) is a former American football quarterback who played in the National Football League for the Buffalo Bills. He played college football at Bowling Green.

College career
McClure played for the Falcons from 1982–85, where he set numerous offensive records. His 900 completions and 10,280 yards passing are both school records. He also threw 63 touchdowns which was the school record until Omar Jacobs threw 71 from 2003–05. In 1985, he led the Falcons to an undefeated regular season, but lost to Fresno State in the California Raisin Bowl.

1982: 113/176 for 1,391 yards with 8 TD vs 13 INT.
1983: 298/466 for 3,264 yards with 16 TD vs 16 INT.
1984: 263/414 for 2,951 yards with 21 TD vs 13 INT.
1985: 226/371 for 2,674 yards with 18 TD vs 16 INT.

NFL replacement player
McClure was drafted in the 12th round of the 1986 NFL Draft by the Buffalo Bills. The arrival of Jim Kelly from the United States Football League pushed him to fourth string on the team's depth chart (behind Kelly, Frank Reich and Art Schlichter), and he was cut along with Schlichter prior to the start of the regular season after injuring his hand in the final preseason game. He was again cut by the Bills in training camp in 1987, but a got a chance to play after all when Buffalo signed him as a replacement player during that year's players strike.

After two weeks of replacement games (both losses, in which Buffalo scored a total of 13 points) and mediocre performances by quarterbacks Dan Manucci and Willie Totten, the Bills named McClure their starting quarterback for the October 18 contest against the New York Giants in Buffalo. The game turned out to be a defensive struggle: neither team scored until New York kicked a field goal early in the fourth quarter. McClure was not helping much, throwing three interceptions. Late in the game, though, Buffalo drove down to the Giants 14, then Todd Schlopy kicked a field goal to tie it and force overtime. In the OT, McClure (whose college nickname was the GOAT) again drove the Bills down the field, this time to the 10, when Schlopy won it with another field goal. The following week, the strike was over and McClure was released.

Among players who appeared in only one NFL game, McClure's 20 completions, 38 attempts and 181 passing yards remain all-time records.

Honors 
 MAC Freshman of the Year 1982
 MAC Offensive Player of the Year 1983,1984,1985
 MAC Most Valuable Player 1984,1985
 Sammy Baugh Trophy 1985
 Inducted in the Bowling Green Hall of Fame in 1991

References

1963 births
Living people
People from Ravenna, Ohio
American football quarterbacks
Bowling Green Falcons football players
Buffalo Bills players
National Football League replacement players